Micheál Ryan (born 1978) is an Irish hurler who played as a left wing-back for the Tipperary senior team.

Ryan joined the team during the 2000 championship and was a member of the team until he left the panel after the 2003 championship. An All-Ireland medalist in the minor grade, he later won an All-Ireland winners' medal and a National Hurling League winners' medal at senior level.

At club level Ryan plays with the Templederry Kenyons club.

References

1978 births
Living people
Templederry Kenyons hurlers
Tipperary inter-county hurlers
All-Ireland Senior Hurling Championship winners